Al-Moḥīṭ al-aʿẓam (Arabic: المحیط الأعظم) is a seven-volume commentary on the Quran written by Sayyid Haydar Amuli that was completed around 1375 or 1376 CE.

Exegetic method
The commentary is premised on Ibn Arabi teachings. In Al-Mohit al-azam, the author brings the Shi'a and the Sufi traditions together. This exegesis includes both esoteric and exoteric approaches.

References

Shia tafsir
Sufi tafsir